The Garraffo Fountain (Italian: Fontana del Garraffo) is a Baroque fountain of Palermo. It is located in Piazza Marina, down the ancient Cassaro street, now called Via Vittorio Emanuele, within the historic centre of Palermo.

History
The name of the fountain comes from the Arabic word "Gharraf", meaning the abundance of water. It was sculpted by Gioacchino Vitagliano in 1698, although the design was previously realized by the architect Paolo Amato. The sculpture represents an abundance goddess riding an eagle fighting against a hydra.

The significance of the allegorical elements is not clear. The eagle could be a symbol of either Palermo or the Hapsburg Spanish monarchy. The statue was patronized by the Spanish Praetor Andrea Salazar.

The location of the Garraffo fountain was in a small piazzetta in the market of the Vucciria market, in front of the monument called Genio del Garraffo, and near the church of Sant'Eulalia dei Catalani until 1862, when it was moved to this airy and verdant Piazza Marina.

A different fountain of the Garaffo, now referred to as the Fontana del Garraffello, was erected in 1589 (or 1591) in piazzetta del Garaffo, it had been moved from its original sited due to the seepage into a neighboring house.

References

External links 

 Fontana del Garraffo - arte.it
 Garraffo Piazza Marina (lungo il corso V. Emanuele) - Official site of the Metropolitan City of Palermo

Garraffo
Baroque architecture in Palermo
Baroque sculptures
Sculptures in Italy
Birds in art
Sculptures of goddesses
Sculptures of women in Italy